Aşiyan is a quarter between Bebek and Rumelihisarı in the Beşiktaş district of Istanbul, Turkey. It is situated on the European side of the Bosphorus. Aşiyan Museum and Aşiyan Asri Cemetery are located in the quarter.

Quarters of Beşiktaş